Mastax ornata is a species of beetle in the family Carabidae with restricted distribution in the Myanmar.

References

Mastax ornata
Beetles of Asia
Beetles described in 1846